Robert Victor Agnone (born October 2, 1985) is a former American football tight end. He was signed by the Washington Redskins as an undrafted free agent in 2009. He was also a member of the New England Patriots and Atlanta Falcons. He played college football at Delaware

Early years
Agnone attended Red Land High School in the small town of Lewisberry, Pennsylvania (pop. 362 (2010 census)), where he played football and basketball. As a receiver in football, he was an honorable mention all-state selection.

College career
After graduating from high school, Agnone attended the University of Pittsburgh beginning in 2004. He redshirted his freshman season, while seeing time at quarterback in drills. He played in one game in 2005. He transferred to the University of Delaware during the winter, and took part in that school's spring drills. He joined quarterback Joe Flacco and tight end Ben Patrick in the 2006 season, making 17 catches on the season for 241 yards. In his 2007 junior season, Agnone took the starting job from a graduated Patrick, 38 catches for 484 yards and an honorable mention All-American selection. In 2008, he caught 16 passes for 161 yards.

Professional career

Washington Redskins
Agnone signed with the Washington Redskins as an undrafted free agent following the 2009 NFL Draft. He was waived by the Redskins on September 5, 2009, during final cuts.

New England Patriots
Agnone was signed to the practice squad of the New England Patriots on September 8, 2009. He was placed on the practice squad/injured list on November 3, where he spent the remainder of the season before being re-signed to a future contract on January 12, 2010. He was waived by the Patriots on May 21, 2010.

Atlanta Falcons
Agnone was signed to the Atlanta Falcons on July 31, 2010

External links
 New England Patriots bio
 Delaware Blue Hens bio

1985 births
Living people
People from York County, Pennsylvania
Players of American football from Pennsylvania
American football tight ends
Delaware Fightin' Blue Hens football players
Washington Redskins players
New England Patriots players
Atlanta Falcons players